The Chancaybaños Reserved Zone (Zona Reservada Chancaybaños) is a protected area in Peru located in the Cajamarca Region, Santa Cruz Province, Chancaybaños District.

See also 
 Natural and Cultural Peruvian Heritage

External links 
 [ www.enjoyperu.com / Chancaybaños Reserved Zone] (Spanish)

Reserved zones of Peru
Geography of Cajamarca Region